Fernhill is a village near Mountain Ash in Rhondda Cynon Taf, Wales.

The village is served by Fernhill railway station on the Merthyr Line - Aberdare branch.

External links
Fernhill residents

Villages in Rhondda Cynon Taf
Mountain Ash, Rhondda Cynon Taf